University Of Swabi (abbreviated UoS), is a public sector university situated in Anbar, Swabi in Khyber Pakhtunkhwa, Pakistan.

Overview & History 
University of Swabi is established by KP government in Anbar, Swabi in 2012. Back in 2012, the ANP led Government of Khyber Pakhtunkhwa decided to upgrade Abdul Wali Khan University Mardan campus to full-fledged University using the royalties of electricity generation and tobacco of Swabi district.

The university offers undergraduate and postgraduate programs in 28 teaching Departments such as Agriculture, Law, Economics, Computer Science, Linguistics to name a few.

Departments & Faculties 
The university currently has the following departments and Faculties.

 Department of Agriculture
 Department of Computer Science
 Department of Economics
 Department of English
 Department of Geology
 Department of Management Sciences
 Department of Microbiology
 Department of PCRS
 Department of Pharmacy
 Department of Sociology
 Department of Zoology
 Department of Chemistry
 Department of Statistics
 Department of Physics
 Department of Mathematics
 Department of Law
 Department of Environmental Sciences
 Department of Botany
 Department of Biotechnology
 Department of Library & Information Sciences
 Department of Journalism & Mass Communication
 Department of Political Science
 Department of Geography
 Department of Psychology
 Department of Education
 Department of Tourism & Hotel Management
 Department of Urdu
 Department of Pashto

See also
 Ghulam Ishaq Khan Institute of Engineering Sciences and Technology
 Women University Swabi
 Government Postgraduate College Swabi
 Universities in Pakistan

References

External links
 Official Website
 

2012 establishments in Pakistan
Educational institutions established in 2012
Public universities and colleges in Khyber Pakhtunkhwa
Swabi District
Universities and colleges in Swabi District